Kowalevskiidae is a family of tunicates belonging to the order Copelata.

Genera:
 Kowalevskia Fol, 1872

References

Appendicularia
Tunicate families
Taxa named by Fernando Lahille